Uproxx (stylized in all caps) is an entertainment and popular culture news website. It was founded in 2008 by Jarret Myer and Brian Brater, and acquired by Woven Digital (later renamed Uproxx Media Group) in 2014. The site's target audience is men aged 18–34. It was acquired by Warner Music Group in August 2018, with Myer and CEO Benjamin Blank remaining in control of the company's operations.

History
Uproxx was founded in 2008 by Jarret Myer and Brian Brater. The two also founded hip hop label Rawkus Records in 1996 and YouTube media company Big Frame in 2011. Uproxx was initially a network of blogs and formed when the founders partnered with the owners of other blogs, including acquiring With Leather and FilmDrunk from Fat Penguin Media founder Ryan Perry, who later signed on as creative director.

Uproxx was acquired by Woven Digital in April 2014. Myer joined Woven as general manager of publishing.

In December 2014, Woven raised US$18 million in Series A funding. A portion of the capital was allocated to growing Uproxx through staff hires and video development, including new web series. Uproxx acquired Dime Magazine in January 2015 to expand the sports division of the site. Warner Music Group acquired Uproxx in August 2018.

Content
Uproxx is a news and discussion website that is geared toward millennials, specifically males aged 18–34. The site covers viral news stories related to entertainment and culture, with an emphasis on sports, film, TV, and music. Uproxx is divided into verticals including Entertainment, Sports, and Life, each of which comprises multiple blogs. These blogs include "With Spandex", about pro wrestling; and Dime Magazine, which focuses on basketball. In addition, Uproxx offers a platform for live Q&As with celebrities and creators to promote upcoming projects.

Video
Video makes up a significant portion of the site's content and Uproxx produces both original and sponsored video.

In 2013, Uproxx partnered with 5-Second Films to produce longer content for Uproxx Video on YouTube. Since its acquisition by Woven, Uproxx has placed more emphasis on video content and released several web series.

The site launched "Luminaries", its first original series in January 2015. The show profiles young inventors and the first two episodes generated 18.5 million views within the first four months. The series was nominated for a Webby Award in 2015.

The site's second series, a parodic news series called The Desk, debuted in March 2015. The next month, in April 2015, Uproxx began a documentary series centered on pop culture called Uproxx Docs. It commenced with a three-part piece about rock band Guns N’ Roses.

Also in 2015, Uproxx launched several sponsored video series. Among these were "Uncharted: Power of Dreams", a show that profiles rising musicians, with Honda, and "Human", a video series about artisans and others who preserve traditional work, sponsored by Coors Banquet. Human won an OMMA award in 2015.

Staff and operations

Uproxx is headquartered in Culver City, California.

The editorial staff is led by editor-in-chief Brett Michael Dykes, and head of publishing Kris Maske.

Other staff members include Steve Bramucci, managing editor of the site's Life section, Phil Cosores, music managing editor, Brian Grubb, senior TV editor, Cherise Johnson, digital media manager for Uproxx Music's original programming, Mike Ryan, senior entertainment writer, and Vince Mancini, senior film writer.

Uproxx Media Group
Uproxx Media Group, originally named Woven Digital, was the owner of Uproxx and its related properties until their acquisition by Warner Music Group in August 2018.

History
The company was founded as Woven Digital in 2010 by Scott Grimes and Michael Laur as an ad network with Grimes serving as the CEO. The network's intended audience was young men, 1834 year old. Woven's mission was to bring the passion points of guys together in one place via a platform agnostic network of websites, videos, and branded content.

The company grew through purchases of websites with large followings. Its first acquisition was lifestyle site BroBible in 2012. Following this were the acquisitions in 2013 of Animal New York, Guyism, and Brotips Media. As Woven's CEO, Grimes drove the 2014 acquisition of Uproxx more than doubling Woven's viewership. In that same year, Woven's reach, including its affiliated sites, exceeded that of Vox Media or Vice Media. Woven was included in the top ten of Fast Company list of "Most Innovative Companies in Hollywood" in early 2015 for "helping brands speak a young man's language". In 2015, Woven Studios was built in Culver City to produce original digital content. The company expanded Uproxx's coverage of sports with the 2015 acquisition of Dime Magazine, diversifying in film and TV by acquiring HitFix in 2016.

The company changed its name in 2017 to Uproxx Media Group, to consolidate under its most public-facing brand and to focus on Uproxx's original, long-form content.

On August 2, 2018, Warner Music Group announced that it had acquired Uproxx and its properties (except for BroBible, which will continue to publish independently) for an undisclosed sum, although Uproxx has raised around $43M (£33 million) from previous investment, which provides some sense of the firm's valuation.

Operations
Uproxx Media Group was a digital media company that owned multiple entertainment sites and created branded content focused on a male millennial audience. , it had six main brands: Uproxx, HitFix, Dime, Real Talk, With Spandex, and BroBible. The company's sites reached more than 90 million unique viewers per month. Uproxx was the company's largest brand, with a viewership of 40 million per month. Headquartered in Culver City, the company also had production facilities in New York and Chicago. The Culver City offices housed a full production studio staffed by writers, illustrators, presenters and video editing staff; the company produced all of its own sponsored videos.

Benjamin Blank was the company's chief executive officer and chief creative officer, and Colin Digiaro served as executive chairman for mergers and acquisitions and fundraising. Other key personnel included Scott Grimes, executive chairman overseeing revenue, Jen Sargent as president, and Uproxx co-creator Jarret Myer, who served as publisher.

Original programming
Uproxx Media Group developed web originals, long- and short-form series and films through Uproxx Studios. Specializing in documentary-style productions, the studio created a piece of  branded content for fast food chain Checkers in 2017 featuring rapper Rick Ross. The short documentary-style video received a positive critical reception and was a featured entry in PR Week and Campaign's 2017 Brand Film Festival. Uproxx Media Group also created a short documentary on Guns N' Roses in 2015, and as of 2017 it has released several original series. The Uproxx series “Uncharted” was created in partnership with Honda Stage, and has won numerous awards, most notably a Gold Clio Award in 2016. Uproxx worked with MillerCoors on "Human" and "Human Limits", a series of short documentary videos that profiled "inspirational" people, entrepreneurs, and artists that was nominated for several awards. It was a MERIT winner for 2017 The One Show and a winner at the 2017 D&AD Awards. Uproxx has also partnered with the United States Marine Corps to create sponsored content.

References

External links

American entertainment websites
Internet properties established in 2008
Mass media about Internet culture
American companies established in 2008
2008 establishments in California
Companies based in Culver City, California
Warner Music Group
2018 mergers and acquisitions